Josep Blay Boqué (born 2 September 1966) known professionally as Pep Blay, is a Catalan writer, script writer and music journalist. As a music journalist, he has interviewed a variety of performers, including Lou Reed, The Cure and Nick Cave. He often works with Spanish artists, including Enrique Bunbury, Iván Ferreiro, and Amparanoia.

Biography
Blay was born on 2 September 1966 in Tarragona, Spain, the youngest of three children. He studied Catalan philology at Universitat de Barcelona, faculty of Tarragona from 1984 to 1989. During his studies he worked as a cultural journalist for the Catalan newspaper Catalunya Sud. He also published poems for the magazine Negre+Roig and founded the collective Andrògina Productions.

After his studies, he moved to Barcelona to begin higher education in theatre theory and critics; he also learnt Japanese. That same year he started to write about literature for the Catalan newspaper AVUI and edited the supplement Rock & Classics. He also worked for magazines like El Temps, Catalònia and Cultura. Between 1990 and 2000 Blay occasionally performed poetry live; a few of his performances can be found in the DVD Poesia en viu a Barcelona (Habitual Video Team/ Propost.org, 1991–2003).

His career as a music journalist started with AVUI in 1993. That same year, he also began to sing in the Tarragonian post mortem-underground band Els Patètix; he spent three years in that group. In 1995, he published a biography of the Catalan musician and songwriter Lluís Llach for the collection Los Autores (SGAE Barcelona). In 1999, Blay started to work for the Catalan TV-channel Televisió de Catalunya as programme director for the cabaret Bohèmia, and also as script writer and art director. He wrote two more biographies about Catalan rockbands: Sopa de Cabra. Si et quedes amb mi, Rosa dels Vents, in 2002 and Els Pets. Cara a cara, Rosa dels Vents, in 2003. In the magazine Enderrock, he created the column "Sexe, Blay & rock'n'roll".

He travelled through Europe, the US, Island, Tanzania and Mexico. In September 2003, he started a one-year-trip around the world to Australia, New Zealand, Papua New Guinea, Brazil and Japan. These experiences led to work as script writer for the travel programme Km33 on the Catalan TV-channel TV3. Thanks to that job, he continued travelling to Morocco, Burkina Faso, Mali and the US. He sends reports about travelling and other topics to the Catalan radio station iCat.

Blay has long been interested in vampirism and polypoetry, and his first novel Vampíria Sound (Plaza & Janés Editores, S.A., 2004), is a radical contemporary music thriller. The biography he wrote about Enrique Bunbury - called Enrique Bunbury. Lo demás es silencio (Plaza & Janés) - found readers amongst both Spanish-speaking and international fans of Enrique Bunbury and his former band Héroes del Silencio. The book has also been published in Mexico.

In 2009, Gotholàndia, a teen fantasy novel in Catalan, was published by Montena. At the same time Erótica Mix, four short stories about music and sex, were published both in Catalan (Rosa dels Vents) and in Spanish (Plaza & Janés). At the end of the year, Blay worked as art director to produce the CD Més raons de pes. El tribut an Umpah-Pah with Enrique Bunbury, Iván Ferreiro, Amparanoia, and other musicians.

Works
Lluís Llach, a biography of the Catalan musician and songwriter Lluís Llach. Col•lecció "Los Autores", Barcelona, 1995, SGAE.
Sopa de Cabra. Si et quedes amb mi, about the Catalan rock band Sopa de Cabra. Barcelona, 2002, Rosa dels Vents. 1st edition, 336 pages, Catalan. ; .
Els Pets. Cara a cara, a history of the Catalan rock band Els Pets. Barcelona, 2003, Rosa dels Vents. 1st edition, 360 pages, Catalan. ; .
Vampíria Sound, a novel about music with thriller and vampirism elements. Barcelona, 2004, Plaza & Janés Editores S.A. Colección Narrativa Rosa dels vents. Catalan. .
Enrique Bunbury. Lo demás es silencio, a biography of Spanish singer and songwriter Enrique Bunbury. Barcelona, 2007, Plaza & Janés. 448 pages, Spanish. .
Gotholàndia, a fantasy novel for older children and teenagers. Barcelona, 2009, Montena. 272 pages, Catalan. .
Eròtica Mix, four short stories. In Catalan: Barcelona, 2009, Rosa dels Vents. 304 pages. . In Spanish: Barcelona, 2009, Plaza & Janés. 296 pages. .
Pretòria. Barcelona, 2010, Ed. Alisis. Ara Llibres SCCL. 229 pages, Catalan. .

References 

Interview with Pep Blay: PAGÈS, Rosa: Pep Blay: defugint el localisme. Revistes catalanes, Revista del Centre de Lectura de Reus, Jahr 1990, Nr. 23 Februar.
Bookintroduction: PALMER, Jordi: Els Pets ja tenen biografia. Ritmes.cat. 09.04.2003.
Interview and bookintroduction : PEÑAS, Esther: Pep Blay, periodista musical. Bunbury tiene auténtica obsesión por sentirse libre. La crónica social. 26.10.2007.
Interview with Pep Blay: GARRANCHO, Juan: Entrevista a Pep Blay. Olvidados Magazine. 31.01.2008.
Radiospot about Pep Blay : CERVERA, Jordi: Pep Blay. Radio iCat fm.
  http://www.dalealplay.com/informaciondecontenido.php?con=203603 Video about Festival of Polipoesie in Barcelona: 17 festival de polipoesia de barcelona pep blay fragmentos del festival realizado en torre llobeta 2009 oktubre docuMentalidades
  : MAIGÍ, Raül: Pep Blay satiritza la corrupció urbanística en la novel·la «Pretòria» . Elpunt.cat. 13.04.2010.

External links 
myspace
Facebook

Writers from Catalonia
1966 births
Living people
Spanish music journalists
Catalan-language writers